Nixon is an American watches, accessories and audio brand, founded in 1997 in Encinitas, California, United States. Focused on the youth lifestyle market. Currently sold in 80 countries worldwide, Nixon maintains stand-alone retail stores in Berkeley, California as well as Bondi & Melbourne, Australia and Kuta, Bali.

History

Nixon was founded by Andy Laats and Chad DiNenna.

Both Laats and DiNenna worked in the action sports industry and were introduced through mutual people working in those circles. Laats, a former snowboard product manager at Burton with an engineering degree from Cornell University, was in the process of earning his Master of Business Administration (MBA) from Stanford University when he and DiNenna met to discuss the startup of Nixon. DiNenna, originally from Southern California, had studied communications at California State University, Long Beach and previously worked in publishing at TransWorld Media for five years prior to the launch of Nixon.

Laats and DiNenna raised nearly US$1 million from venture capitalists to start Nixon and, in 1997, the debut catalog was released; seven models were released through 200 retailers. Nixon opened a subsidiary in France in 2000, and by 2005 had 90 models, and 60 employees, with sales growing by 55 percent annually.

Purchase
In December 2006, Nixon was acquired by Billabong International for approximately US$55 million and a deferred payment of approximately US$76 million in FY 2012.

During the spring of 2012, after six years under the Billabong umbrella of brands, Nixon once again became an independent brand. Nixon established an agreement with Trilantic Capital Partners (“TCP”) and Billabong, each of which now owns a 48.5% stake in the brand, with the balance 3% held by Nixon management, including Laats and DiNenna. The resulting transaction values Nixon at approximately US$464 million, representing a multiple of approximately 9.2x LTM EBITDA.

Products

Watches 

Nixon sells many models of wristwatches, digital and analog, for men and women, with movements from Japan and Switzerland.

Audio

In 2009, Nixon released its first audio products with a line of headphones and has since expanded to include portable speakers.

Events

Nixon Surf Challenge
The Nixon Surf Challenge started out as a group of Nixon team riders and has since developed into an annual invite-only event.

Since 2000, Nixon has hosted the Surf Challenge near the Spanish/French border in San Sebastián, Spain and has featured a €10,000 prize purse. For its ten-year anniversary, the event was brought to Lofoten Islands, Norway. In 2012, the contest was brought to La Graciosa in the Canary Islands of Spain.

Nixon Jibfest
Jibbing is the snowboarding term for performing skateboarding-inspired tricks, like sliding on obstacles. Conversations to create the event first came to Nixon via Jeremy Jones, JP Walker, and Dave Downing in the late 90s ultimately resulting in the creation of the Nixon JibFest.

In 2011, after an eight-year hiatus, the Nixon JibFest returned. The revitalized contest featured a new custom course, new riders and a new jibbers playground. It was documented for a web series that launched on vice.com

References

Watch brands
Watch manufacturing companies of the United States
Surfwear brands
American companies established in 1997
Manufacturing companies established in 1997
Clothing companies established in 1997
Swimwear manufacturers
Skateboarding companies
Snowboarding companies